Pipra is a genus of birds in the manakin family Pipridae.

Taxonomy and species list
The genus Pipra was introduced by the Swedish naturalist Carl Linnaeus in 1764. The name was used by Ancient Greek authors such as Aristotle for a small bird but it is unclear which species it referred to. The type species was designated as the crimson-hooded manakin in 1840 by the English zoologist George Robert Gray.

The genus contains three species:

References

 
Bird genera
Pipridae
Taxonomy articles created by Polbot